Mulebreen is a glacier 6 nautical miles (11 km) wide, flowing west-northwest into the southeast side of Stefansson Bay, Kemp Land, Antarctica. First mapped by Norwegian cartographers from air photos taken by the Lars Christensen Expedition 1936–37, and names Mulebreen Glacier (the snout glacier).

See also
 List of glaciers in the Antarctic
 Glaciology

References

 

Glaciers of Kemp Land